Cyrtocrinida is an order of sea lilies which contains two suborders and three families.

Characteristics
Members of this order have stems consisting of a single skeletal unit or a very small number of units. There are no cirri, and the expanded base of the stem attaches directly to the substrate. The calyx may be asymmetrical and consists of five arms attached to five radial ossicles. The arms subdivide at arm ossicle I or II.

Families
The World Register of Marine Species includes the following groups in the order:
 Suborder Cyrtocrinina
 Family Sclerocrinidae Jaekel, 1918
 Suborder Holopodina
 Family Eudesicrinidae Bather, 1899
 Family Holopodidae Zittel, 1879

References

 
Articulata (Crinoidea)
Echinoderm orders